Frederick "Frits" Potgieter (born 13 March 1974, in Pretoria) is a retired South African athlete who competed mostly in the discus throw. He won the silver medal at the 1992 World Junior Championships, as well as several senior medals at regional level. He represented his country at the 2000 Summer Olympics, as well as two World Championships without reaching the final.

Potgieter played for Waterkloof High School and Northern Transvaal's Craven for three years. He then participated at various sporting events, including the Universiade and African Games winning medals in discus throwing discipline. A four-time gold medalist, he was placed in fourth place on the South African all time list.

Following 2000 Summer Olympics, Potgieter joined Pretoria Rugby Club, after South African athletics initialized a new policy which states that bans athletes 26 and older to participate in international events.

His personal best in the event was 64.16 metres.

His brother, Karel Potgieter, is a former shot putter.

Competition record

References

1974 births
Living people
South African male shot putters
South African male discus throwers
Athletes (track and field) at the 2000 Summer Olympics
Olympic athletes of South Africa
Commonwealth Games competitors for South Africa
Athletes (track and field) at the 1998 Commonwealth Games
Sportspeople from Pretoria
African Games silver medalists for South Africa
African Games medalists in athletics (track and field)
Universiade medalists in athletics (track and field)
African Games bronze medalists for South Africa
Athletes (track and field) at the 1995 All-Africa Games
Athletes (track and field) at the 1999 All-Africa Games
Universiade silver medalists for South Africa
Medalists at the 1995 Summer Universiade
20th-century South African people
21st-century South African people